Group A of the 2021 FIFA Arab Cup took place from 30 November 2021 to 6 December 2021. The group consisted of hosts Qatar, Iraq, Oman and Bahrain.

The top two teams, Qatar and Oman, advanced to the quarter-finals.

Teams

Standings 

In the quarter-finals:
Qatar advanced to play against United Arab Emirates (runners-up of Group B).
Oman advanced to play against Tunisia (winners of Group B).

Matches

Iraq vs Oman 

Assistant referees:
Walter López (Honduras)
Christian Ramirez (Honduras)
Fourth official:
Wilton Sampaio (Brazil)
Video assistant referee:
Jair Marrufo (United States)
Assistant video assistant referees:
Juan Soto (Venezuela)
Ezequiel Brailovsky (Argentina)
Rafael Traci (Brazil)

Qatar vs Bahrain

Assistant referees:
Paweł Sokolnicki (Poland)
Tomasz Listkiewicz (Poland)
Fourth official:
Andrés Matonte (Uruguay)
Video assistant referee:
Tomasz Kwiatkowski (Poland)
Assistant video assistant referees:
Guillermo Cuadra Fernández (Spain)
Bruno Pires (Brazil)
Leodán González (Uruguay)

Bahrain vs Iraq

Assistant referees:
Zakhele Siwela (South Africa)
Jerson Dos Santos (Angola)
Fourth official:
Daniel Siebert (Germany)
Video assistant referee:
Rédouane Jiyed (Morocco)
Assistant video assistant referees:
Fernando Guerrero (Mexico)
Elvis Noupue (Cameroon)
Christian Dingert (Germany)

Oman vs Qatar

Assistant referees:
Danilo Manis (Brazil)
Bruno Pires (Brazil)
Fourth official:
Bakary Gassama (Gambia)
Video assistant referee:
Rafael Traci (Brazil)
Assistant video assistant referees:
Guillermo Cuadra Fernández (Spain)
Rafael Foltyn (Germany)
Shaun Evans (Australia)

Oman vs Bahrain

Assistant referees:
Jun Mihara (Japan)
Osamu Nomura (Japan)
Fourth official:
Jair Marrufo (United States)
Video assistant referee:
Hiroyuki Kimura (Japan)
Assistant video assistant referees:
Kevin Blom (Netherlands)
Adonai Escobedo (Mexico)
Fernando Guerrero (Mexico)

Qatar vs Iraq

Assistant referees:
Djibril Camara (Senegal)
Elvis Noupue (Cameroon)
Fourth official:
Said Martínez (Honduras)
Video assistant referee:
Shaun Evans (Australia)
Assistant video assistant referees:
Rédouane Jiyed (Morocco)
Tomasz Listkiewicz (Poland)
Juan Soto (Venezuela)

Notes

References

External links
 

2021 FIFA Arab Cup
2021–22 in Qatari football
2021–22 in Iraqi football
2021–22 in Omani football
2021–22 in Bahraini football